Kechut, formerly Kushchi and Kush-Bilyak, is an abandoned village in the Jermuk Municipality of the Vayots Dzor Province of Armenia.

See also
 Jermuk

References

World Gazeteer: Armenia – World-Gazetteer.com

Populated places in Vayots Dzor Province